Daniel Hill Dickerson (born November 13, 1958) is an American sportscaster, best known for his current position as the lead radio play-by-play voice of Major League Baseball's Detroit Tigers on the Detroit Tigers Radio Network.

Early life and education

Dickerson grew up in Birmingham, Michigan, the son of James Preston Dickerson (1926–2000) and Rosemary Dickerson (née Wilcox). James was a political science professor at Oakland Community College whom Ronald Reagan appointed in 1981 as the special assistant to the Deputy Assistant Secretary of Defense. Dickerson attended the Cranbrook School in Bloomfield Hills before graduating from Ohio Wesleyan University with a Bachelor of Arts degree in 1980.

Early career

He began his radio career at WMAX in Grand Rapids, Michigan as a news anchor and reporter. He also covered high-school football and basketball.  He moved to competitor WCUZ in 1982, where he would cover sports for the next six years.  Dickerson moved to Detroit in 1988 and WWJ, where he served as a general assignment news reporter and weekend news and sports anchor.  He also hosted the post-game call-in show for the station's Detroit Lions broadcasts.

In 1995, Dickerson moved to crosstown competitor WJR, where he held a variety of positions.  He served as co-host of the weeknight sports call-in show Sportswrap; morning sports anchor; sideline reporter and fill-in play-by-play announcer for Michigan Wolverines football; and play-by-play announcer for Michigan basketball for two seasons.

While visiting with legendary Tigers announcer Ernie Harwell in the WJR booth during the final game at Tiger Stadium in 1999, Dickerson was invited by Harwell to call an inning of play-by-play. The following season, he joined the Tigers' radio broadcast team full-time, calling the middle innings of each game while Harwell handled the rest. Along with former Tigers catcher and color analyst Jim Price, this crew remained intact for three full seasons, even as the team switched radio flagship stations (from WJR to WXYT) at the end of the 2000 season.

Current roles

Dickerson took over as lead play-by-play announcer on Tigers radio following Harwell's retirement at the end of the 2002 season, working with Price as a two-man crew.

Dickerson has called several events for Fox Sports Detroit television, including high school football since 2002, a Michigan State Spartans hockey game in 2008, and Detroit Titans basketball games in 2010 and 2011.

Dickerson is a longtime member of the Detroit Sports Media Association, founded in 1948 by pioneering Tigers announcer Ty Tyson. He was honored by DSMA in 2009 with the Tyson Award for Excellence in Sports Broadcasting, and has been named Michigan Sportscaster of the Year three times (2005, 2006, 2014) by the National Sportscasters and Sportswriters Association.

During the Tigers' 2016 season, Dickerson moved to the television booth to call several road series for Fox Sports Detroit while regular TV announcer Mario Impemba joined Jim Price in the radio booth, an experiment that was discarded the following season.

Dickerson also appears as the Detroit Tigers correspondent on MLB Network's weekday afternoon baseball news show The Rundown.

He also hosts a hot stove podcast with Pat Caputo called TigerTalk during the winter months, available on the Tigers' website and iTunes.

Broadcasting style
In a 2006 interview, Dickerson described his broadcasting style:

Dickerson's typical home run call is "Way back and gone!" For long home runs hit by Tigers, he often uses an exuberant "Watch it fly!" For strikeouts, Dickerson's typical call is "Swing and a miss—he got 'im on strikes!"

Memorable calls
On October 14, 2006, when Magglio Ordóñez hit a walk-off home run in Game 4 of the ALCS, making the Tigers the American League champions for the first time since 1984:
 

On June 12, 2007, when Tigers pitcher Justin Verlander threw the sixth no-hitter in franchise history against the Milwaukee Brewers:

On October 18, 2012, when Yankees infielder Jayson Nix popped out to Tigers first baseman Prince Fielder in game 4 of the ALCS, making the Tigers the 2012 American League champions:"Coke is ready. The 1-1 to Nix—he swings and he pops it up on the right side! Fielder calling for it and he MAKES THE CATCH—WORLD SERIES BOUND! The Tigers sweep the Yankees with an 8-1 win!"On August 22, 2021, when Tigers designated hitter Miguel Cabrera hit his 500th career home run:

Personal life

Dickerson lives in Clarkston, Michigan with his wife Lori Anne, a journalism professor at Michigan State University, and their children Rachel and Justin.

Dickerson tripped on a curb while jogging outside the Detroit Tigers team hotel in Kansas City, Missouri on May 26, 2009, forcing him to return to Michigan for surgery and miss six games. John Keating filled in for the remainder of the Kansas City series, and Al Kaline substituted for the Baltimore series. Dickerson returned to work on June 2.

References

1958 births
Living people
American radio sports announcers
American television sports announcers
College basketball announcers in the United States
College football announcers
College hockey announcers in the United States
Cranbrook Educational Community alumni
Detroit Tigers announcers
High school basketball announcers in the United States
High school football announcers in the United States
Major League Baseball broadcasters
Michigan Wolverines football announcers
Ohio Wesleyan University alumni
People from Birmingham, Michigan
People from Clarkston, Michigan